Tāufaʻāhau Tupou IV (born Siaosi Tāufaʻāhau Tupoulahi; 4 July 1918 – 10 September 2006) was the King of Tonga, from the death of his mother, Queen Sālote Tupou III, in 1965 until his own death in 2006.

Immediately prior to his death, he was the fifth longest-reigning living monarch in the world after Kings Bhumibol Adulyadej of Thailand, Saqr bin Mohammed Al Qasimi of Ras al Khaimah, Queen Elizabeth II of the United Kingdom and Commonwealth Realms and Abdul Halim of Kedah. He was the tallest and heaviest Tongan monarch, measuring 195cm (6′ 5″) and weighing 199kg (440lb).

Biography 
The King's full baptismal name was Siaosi Tāufaʻāhau Tupoulahi, but he was soon better known by the traditional title reserved for Crown Princes: Tupoutoʻa (bestowed in 1937), later replaced by the title he inherited from his father: Tungī (or using both: Tupoutoʻa-Tungī, in that time written as Tuboutoʻa-Tugi). He kept the Tungī title until his death. From a traditional point of view he was not only the Tungī, which is the direct descendant from the Tuʻi Haʻatakalaua, but he was also, on becoming king, the 22nd Tuʻi Kanokupolu. The link with the Tuʻi Tonga, was more indirect. He was not a Tuʻi Tonga too (as that office has gone over into the Kalaniuvalu line), but his grandmother Lavinia Veiongo (wife of George Tupou II) was the great-granddaughter of Laufilitonga, the last Tuʻi Tonga, and his wife Halaevalu Mataʻaho (not to be confused with the King's wife of the same name and same family), who was the daughter of Tupou ʻAhomeʻe, who was the daughter of Lātūfuipeka, the Tamahā (sister of the Tuʻi Tonga). By consequence, the King's daughter, Pilolevu, was the first woman in Tongan culture to really have the blood of the three major Royal dynasties in her veins and become the highest-ranking person ever.

The King was a keen sportsman and religious preacher in his youth. He was educated at Newington College and studied law at Sydney University while resident at Wesley College in Sydney, Australia. He was appointed Minister of Education by Queen Sālote in 1943, Minister of Health in 1944, and in 1949, Premier. He remained a lay preacher of the Free Wesleyan Church until his death, and in some circumstances, was empowered to appoint an acting church president. In the 1970s, he was the heaviest monarch in the world, weighing in at over 200 kg (440 pounds or 31 stone). For his visits to Germany, the German Government used to commission special chairs that could support his weight. The King used to take them home, considering them as state presents. In the 1990s, he took part in a national fitness campaign, losing a third of his weight.

The King was also very tall, standing . Swedish shoemaker Per-Enok Kero reported that "He weighed 180 kilos and had shoe size 47 in length and 52 in breadth."

He wielded great political authority and influence in Tonga's essentially aristocratic system of government, together with the country's nobles, who controlled 70% (now 35%) of the Legislative Assembly of Tonga. His involvement in an investment scandal, however, involving his American financial advisor Jesse Bogdonoff, had in his last years embroiled the King in controversy, leading to calls for greater government transparency and democratisation. The fact the King had previously appointed Bogdonoff, Tonga’s official Court Jester, though likely only done as a joke for Bogdonoff’s birthday which happened to fall on April 1, compounded the scandal’s embarrassment. In 2005, the government spent several weeks negotiating with striking civil service workers before reaching a settlement. The king's nephew, Tuʻi Pelehake (ʻUluvalu), served as mediator. A constitutional commission presented a series of recommendations for constitutional reform to the King a few weeks before his death.

Death and funeral 
On 15 August 2006, Tongan Prime Minister Feleti Sevele interrupted radio and television broadcasts to announce that the King was gravely ill in the Mercy Hospital in Auckland and to ask the 104,000 people of the island chain to pray for their King, He died 26 days later, at 23:34 on 10 September 2006 (New Zealand time: it was just after midnight on 11 September in Tongan time). He was 88 and had reigned for 41 years.

Tāufaʻāhau Tupou IV was buried on 19 September 2006 at Malaʻe Kula (the Royal cemetery) in the Tongan capital, Nukuʻalofa.  Thousands of Tongans watched the funeral and mourners included many foreign dignitaries, including Japanese Crown Prince Naruhito, New Zealand Prime Minister Helen Clark, Fijian Prime Minister Laisenia Qarase, Vanuatu president Kalkot Mataskelekele, the American Samoan Governor Togiola Tulafono, Niue Premier Vivian Young, and the Duke of Gloucester, a cousin of Queen Elizabeth II.  The funeral blended Christian and ancient Polynesian burial rites. The funeral was overseen by the Royal undertaker Lauaki and his men of the Haʻatufunga (clan), also known as the nima tapu (sacred hands).

According to the International Herald Tribune, "Tupou IV's 41-year reign made him one of the world's longest-serving sovereigns", after Thailand's King Bhumibol Adulyadej; Queen Elizabeth II, as queen of Australia, Barbados, Canada, Jamaica, New Zealand, and the United Kingdom, specifically; and Samoa's head of state, Malietoa Tanumafili II.

Marriage and children 
He was married to Queen Halaevalu Mataʻaho ʻAhomeʻe (1926–2017) and the couple had four children:

 Prince Siaosi Tāufaʻāhau Manumataongo Tukuʻaho Tupou (1948–2012), while as Crown Prince, better known by the hereditary title: Tupoutoʻa (once his father did not need it any longer). He succeeded him later as George Tupou V.
 Princess Royal Salote Mafileʻo Pilolevu Tuita (born Tukuʻaho in 1951). Lady Tuita by marriage.
 Prince Fatafehi 'Alaivahamama'o Tuku'aho (stripped of his title after marrying a commoner, later bestowed with the hereditary title of Māʻatu, born in 1954, deceased in 2004). He married his first wife Heimataura Seiloni, 21 July 1980, who died of cancer in Nuku'alofa, 19 September 1985. She was the adopted daughter of High Chief Matagialalua Tavana Salmon Anderson of Tahiti and daughter of his wife Tongan singer and songwriter, Tu'imala Kaho. Lord Ma'atu then married Alaile'ula Poutasi Jungblut, 11 July 1989. Alaile'ula, is the daughter of Melvin Jungblut and his wife Lola Tosi Malietoa who is the daughter of the former head of state of Samoa Malietoa Tanumafili II. Lord Ma'atu and Dowager Lady Ma'atu have four children. Prince Tungi, Salote Maumautaimi Tuku'aho, Sione Ikamafana Tuku'aho and Etani Ha'amea Tuku'aho. Their eldest son Prince Tungi inherited the Princely title in 2008. Their second son Sione Ikamafana Tuku'aho was adopted by his paternal aunt, Princess Royal, Princess Pilolevu Tuita.
 Prince ʻAhoʻeitu ʻUnuakiʻotonga Tukuʻaho (born 1959), better known by his traditional titles: Tupoutoʻa Lavaka (until the death of his father known as: ʻUlukālala Lavaka Ata). As his elder brother died without legitimate issue, he became King Tupou VI in 2012.

Honours

National 
 : Sovereign Knight Grand Cross with Collar of the Royal Order of Pouono
 : Sovereign Knight Grand Cross Of the Order of King George Tupou I
 : Sovereign Knight Grand Cross with Collar of the Order of the Crown of Tonga
 : Sovereign Recipient of the Royal Tongan Medal of Merit
 : Sovereign Recipient of the Tongan Red Cross Medal

Foreign 
 : Recipient of the Royal Medal of Recompense
 : Grand Cross of the Order of the Legion of Honour
 : Grand Cross of the Order of Merit of the Federal Republic of Germany, Special Class
 : Grand Cross of the Order of Tahiti Nui
 : Knight Grand Cordon with Collar of the Order of the Chrysanthemum
  Republic of China: Grand Cross the Order of Brilliant Jade
 : Knight Grand Cross of the Order of St Michael and St George
 : Knight Grand Cross of the Royal Victorian Order
 : Knight Commander of the Order of the British Empire
 : Bailiff Grand Cross of the Venerable Order of Saint John
 : Recipient of the Medal of Merit of the Legion of Frontiersmen
 : Recipient of the Queen Elizabeth II Silver Jubilee Medal

Namesakes 

 Tonga House at Newington College

Family tree

References

External links 

 Obituary of Tāufaʻāhau Tupou IV with historical context
 Official announcement of Tāufaʻāhau Tupou IV's passing away
 Website of the Tongan Monarchy
 New Zealand Herald Feature Article
 Recent Visit of HM King Tāufaʻāhau Tupou IV to Hong Kong
 The 1993 Silver Jubilee of Tāufaʻāhau Tupou IV
 Pacific Magazine: Thousands Turn Out For King's Funeral

|-

Tongan Methodists
1918 births
2006 deaths
People educated at Newington College
Tongan monarchs
Prime Ministers of Tonga
People from Nukuʻalofa
University of Sydney alumni

Honorary Knights Grand Cross of the Order of St Michael and St George
Honorary Knights Grand Cross of the Royal Victorian Order
Honorary Knights Commander of the Order of the British Empire
Grand Crosses Special Class of the Order of Merit of the Federal Republic of Germany
Knights of the Order of Saint John (chartered 1888)
Recipients of the Order of Tahiti Nui